Zsolt Kojnok (born 15 February 2001) is a Hungarian professional footballer who plays for Fehérvár.

Career statistics
.

References

External links

2001 births
People from Mór
Sportspeople from Fejér County
Living people
Hungarian footballers
Hungary youth international footballers
Association football defenders
Fehérvár FC players
Budaörsi SC footballers
Nemzeti Bajnokság I players
Nemzeti Bajnokság II players